Morten Gamst Pedersen (born 8 September 1981) is a Norwegian professional footballer who last played as a midfielder for Åsane.

Pedersen began his career with Tromsø, then played for English side Blackburn Rovers between 2004 and 2013 making a total of 349 appearences. He then played for the Turkish side Karabükspor. Gamst Pedersen signed with Rosenborg in 2014. With Rosenborg he won the 2015 Tippeligaen, and the 2015 Norwegian Cup.
In February 2016, Gamst Pedersen re-signed for Tromsø on a 1-year contract.

Since he made his debut in 2004, Pedersen has been capped more than 80 times, and scored 17 goals, for Norway. He was an international regular until August 2012, when he was left off of the national team.

Club career

Tromsø IL
Pedersen was born in Vadsø, Finnmark. He had his breakthrough in the Norwegian top division club Tromsø, scoring 7 goals in the 2004 season, before he signed with Blackburn with only half a season played by August. The fee was £1.5 million, which could rise to £2.5 million on the basis of future appearances. Gamst was required to fill the gap left by Damien Duff, who had left in July 2003 to go to Chelsea.

Blackburn Rovers

Pedersen was signed by former Blackburn boss Graeme Souness back in 2004, just in time for the 2004–05 season. The Norwegian international made his Premier League debut in a 1–1 draw against local rivals Manchester United on 28 August 2004, a match Blackburn were leading until deep into injury time. He initially struggled to make an impact in the Premier League and had lengthy period of not being selected after Souness was replaced by Mark Hughes as the Blackburn manager in September 2004. However, he started the year of 2005 in style, scoring against Cardiff City on his return to side and going on to score three goals in his next three matches. In his first season in English football he featured in 27 matches and scored 8 goals in all competitions.

2005–06 saw Pedersen make the left-midfield position his own and he has become well known for scoring many spectacular goals, such as a volley against Fulham in August 2005 which won BBC Match of the Day's Goal of the Month. The highlight of his Blackburn career came in September 2005, when he scored both goals in a 2–1 victory against Manchester United at Old Trafford.

During the 2006–07 season, Pedersen seemingly struggled for form during the early half of the league season, but returned to form in the second half of the campaign. With new management under Paul Ince in 2008, Pedersen found himself in and out of the team, but when Ince was dismissed in December 2008 and Sam Allardyce was appointed Pedersen regained a regular starting position. He has been frequently used a central attacking midfielder under Allardyce, initially with great success. On 17 April 2010, Pedersen, was poked in the cheek and then the eye from Everton midfielder Mikel Arteta, who acted angrily after Pedersen had tackled him in a challenge. They both were booked for stopping play.

After a year of transfer negotiations, Blackburn announced that Pedersen had signed a new four-year deal at Ewood Park on 19 May 2010, which would see him stay contracted until the summer of 2014. He went on to make more than 30 appearances for them, and scored three goals in the 2009–10 Premier League campaign, in which Blackburn finished 10th, achieving 50 points and winning 10 league games at home and three away. Blackburn chairman, John Williams, who completed the formalities of the deal, added: "Sam made this, together with finding a striker, being our summer priority. "He regards Morten as a key member of the Rovers squad and his future at Ewood Park is now secure." On 6 November 2010, he scored a 40-yard free-kick against Wigan Athletic, in a 2–1 victory at Ewood Park, playing the full 90 minutes. And then four days later, on 10 November, he netted against Newcastle United at St James' Park, scoring in the third minute with his right foot following an assist from teammate Brett Emerton and he also took a punch to the stomach by Joey Barton. This was also coincidentally his 40th goal for the club in all competitions. On 21 November, in the game against Aston Villa, he scored twice at Ewood Park. First, from a free kick on the stroke of half time and the second came from a deflection off Ryan Nelsen's shot in the 66th minute. Rovers went on to win the game 2–0. At the end of the 2010–11 season, he had made 39 appearances and scored four league goals for Rovers in all competitions.

On 13 August 2011, Pedersen started against Wolverhampton Wanderers at Ewood Park in a 2–1 defeat in their opening 2011–12 Premier League fixture. On 20 August 2011, he started against Aston Villa in a 3–1 defeat at Villa Park and scored Rovers' only goal in the 52nd minute. On 24 August 2011, Pedersen captained Blackburn in their 3–1 win over Sheffield Wednesday at Ewood Park in the second round of the League Cup. Three days later, in a league game with Everton at Ewood Park, he suffered a thigh injury in a 1–0 loss.

Karabükspor

Gamst Pedersen was told in August 2013 by Blackburn Rovers that he was allowed to find himself a new club. Berlingske Tidende reported that Gamst Pedersen was in talks with FC Copenhagen, but after the Norwegian Ståle Solbakken was hired as manager of the Danish side, he stated that he did not want to sign Gamst Pedersen. On 30 August 2013, he joined the Turkish side Karabükspor on a free transfer, after he had made 288 league appearances for the Ewood Park outfit.

Return to Norway 
After leaving Turkish football, Gamst Pedersen returned to his native Norway to continue his football career. He signed for Rosenborg and made 28 league appearances scoring 3 goals over 2 seasons. At the end of his Rosenborg contract he remained in the top division of Norwegian football returning to his first senior club, Tromsø. Whilst representing Tromsø, Gamst Pedersen made 88 league appearances scoring 3 goals.

Carrying on his footballing career into his 40s, Gamst Pedersen moved to Alta in the 2nd division (2. Divisjon) of Norwegian football where he is currently still playing and wears the number 12 shirt.

International career
Gamst Pedersen scored two goals in his debut for Norway against Northern Ireland on 18 February 2004.

On 2 September 2006, in a Euro 2008 qualifier against Hungary, Pedersen, whose favourite player as a kid was Marco van Basten, scored a goal which was very similar to van Basten's famous goal in the final of the 1988 European Football Championship. Major newspapers Aftenposten, Dagbladet and VG all dubbed him van Gamsten as a result of the goal. After the match against Hungary, he received the coveted Golden Watch award given to him by the Football Association of Norway on the occasion of his 25th appearance for his country.

On 12 August 2009, he scored two goals for Norway in a world cup qualifier against Scotland, scoring in stoppage time in both the first and second half. On 17 November 2010, Pedersen scored in the 34th minute to equalise, playing the full 90 minutes against Republic of Ireland, at the Aviva Stadium, scoring with a superb curling free-kick into the top corner in a 2–1 win. On 4 June 2011, Pedersen started the Euro 2012 qualifier against Portugal in Lisbon, where he played the full 90 minutes in a 1–0 defeat. On 7 June 2011, he completed the full 90 minutes and was Norway's matchwinner when he scored in the 83rd minute from a rebound after he missed a penalty against Lithuania in a friendly game held in Oslo.

He played his last match so far for Norway against Greece on 15 August 2012 in a 2–3 loss, and he has been capped 74 times scoring 14 goals. Gamst Pedersen was left off of the squad for the 2014 World Cup qualifying matches against Iceland and Slovenia in September 2012, and was not called up for the national team for over a year when on 11 November 2013 he was included in Per-Mathias Høgmo squad for the friendly matches against Denmark and Scotland after Daniel Braaten called absent due to an injury.

Personal life
Morten Gamst Pedersen is the son of Ernst Pedersen, a former footballer who played in the Norwegian Premier League for Bodø/Glimt and Vålerenga in the late 1970s and early 1980s. His father trained Morten to use his left foot rather than his natural right foot in a bid to help him become a professional player, as there is less competition for left-sided roles within the sport. As a result, his left foot has become his dominant foot.

Pedersen is of partial Sami origin. In a 2007 interview with Sami newspaper Ságat, Pedersen said he has Sami blood from both parents, though mostly from his mother's side. However, he admits his knowledge of the Sami language is very limited.

Pedersen fronted Norwegian boyband The Players, alongside fellow footballers Freddy dos Santos, Raymond Kvisvik, Kristofer Hæstad and Øyvind Svenning. Released in aid of the Soccer Against Crime campaign, their first single became a hit across Scandinavia.

Pedersen is a distant relative of Norwegian musician Paul Waaktaar-Savoy.

Pedersen used nicotine patches for the last 5 years of his career.

Career statistics

Club

International

Scores and results list Norway's goal tally first, score column indicates score after each Gamst Pedersen goal

Honours
Tromsø 

 1. divisjon: 2002

Rosenborg
Tippeligaen: 2015
Norwegian Football Cup: 2015

Individual
Eliteserien Top assist provider: 2017

References

External links

1981 births
Living people
People from Vadsø
Norwegian footballers
Association football wingers
Tromsø IL players
Blackburn Rovers F.C. players
Kardemir Karabükspor footballers
Rosenborg BK players
Alta IF players
Eliteserien players
Norwegian First Division players
Norwegian Second Division players
Premier League players
English Football League players
Süper Lig players
Norway youth international footballers
Norway under-21 international footballers
Norway international footballers
Norwegian expatriate footballers
Expatriate footballers in England
Expatriate footballers in Turkey
Norwegian expatriate sportspeople in England
Norwegian expatriate sportspeople in Turkey
Norwegian Sámi sportspeople
Sportspeople from Troms og Finnmark